The Rockwood Lodge Barn and Pigsty is located in Green Bay, Wisconsin. In 2004, the site was added to the State and the National Register of Historic Places.

See also
Rockwood Lodge

References

Barns on the National Register of Historic Places in Wisconsin
National Register of Historic Places in Brown County, Wisconsin
Buildings and structures in Green Bay, Wisconsin
Brick buildings and structures
Buildings and structures completed in 1938